Chiddingstone Hoath is a hamlet in the Sevenoaks District of Kent, England. Notable buildings include Hoath House, and Stonewall Park, for some time home of the Meade-Waldo family.

It was visited by Charles Rennie Mackintosh in 1910.

Hamlets in Kent